Monarchs deposed in the 18th century
 
This page has the monarchs deposed between 1700 and 1800

Aceh Darussalam
Baginda Seri Sultan Badrul Alam, Sultan of Aceh Darussalam. Deposed by the Uleebalang in 1702.
Baginda Seri Sultan Sharif Lamtawi, Sultan of Aceh Darussalam. Deposed by the UleeBalang in 1703

Ambohimanga
Andrianjafy, King of Ambohimanga and Ambohitrabiby, deposed and killed, 1787.

Ambohitrabiby
Andrianjafy, King of Ambohimanga and Ambohitrabiby, deposed and killed in 1787.

Ansbach
Christian Frederick Charles Alexander, Margrave of Brandenburg-Ansbach and Bayreuth, abdicated 1791, died 1806.

Banganapalle
Mansur ud-Daula, Nawab Sayyid Ghulam Muhammad 'Ali Khan I Bahadur, Jagirdar of Banganapalle, deposed 1784, restored 1789.

Bavaria
Maximilian II Emanuel, Elector of Bavaria, deposed 1706, restored 1714.

Bayreuth
Christian Frederick Charles Alexander, Margrave of Brandenburg-Ansbach and Bayreuth, abdicated 1791, died 1806.

Benares

Rafa'at wa Awal-i-Martabat Raja Sri Chait Singh Sahib Bahadur, Raja of Benares, deposed 1781.

Bentheim
Friedrich Karl Philipp, Count of Bentheim, deposed by the Hannover in 1753. Died 1803.

Brunswick-Wolfenbüttel
Anton Ulrich Duke of Brunswick, deposed 1702, restored 1704, died 1714.

Kingdom of Corsica
Theodore of Corsica, 1736.

France
Louis XVI, King of France, deposed 1792, executed 1793.

Hawaii
Kiwala‘o, High Chief and King of Hawaii. Deposed and killed 1782 by his cousin Kamehameha I
Kalanikupule, 27th Moi/King of Maui and Oau. Deposed and sacrificed by Kamehameha I 1795
Kaumualii, 23rd King of Kauai. Surrendered peacefully to Kamehameha I 1810

Hohenlohe-Bartenstein
Ludwig Karl Franz Leopold, Prince of Hohenlohe-Bartenstein, deposed or abdicated 1798.

Isenburg-Marienborn
Karl August of Karl August, Count of Isenburg-Marienborn, deposed 1725.

Junagadh
H.E. Shri Diwan Nawab Muhammad Mahabat Khanji I Bahadur Khanji, Nawab Sahib of Junagad, deposed 1760, reinstated 1762.

Kantipura
Jayaprakasamalla King (Rajadhiraja Paramesvara Paramabhattaraka Sri Sri N.N. Vijayarajye Nepala) of Kantipura 1735-1746, deposed or abdicated 1746, restored 1752, reigned until 25 September 1768.

Kelantan
Raja Long Sulaiman ibni al-Marhum Sultan Long Bahar, deposed 1739, restored 1746, redeposed 1756.

Knyphausen
William Graf von Bentinck und von Aldenburg baron of Knyphausen 1738-1754, deposed or abdicated 1754, died 1764.

Kanokupolu
Tu'ihalafata'i, 9th Tu'i Kanokupolu 1777-1782, abdicated 1782.
Mulikiha'amea, 16th Tu'i Ha-a Takala'ua and 11th Tu'i Kanokupolu, reigned 1789, abdicated 1793
Tupou Mohe'ofo, 12th Tu'i Kanokupolu reigned 1793, deposed 1793.

Lalitapura
Jayamahendramalla, King (Rajadhiraja Paramesvara Paramabhattaraka Sri Sri N.N. Vijayarajye Nepala) of Lalitapura 1709, deposed or abdicated 1709, restored 1709, reigned until 1714.

Lippe-Alverdissen
Friedrich Ernst of Lippe-Alverdissen, Count and Noble Lord (Graf und Edler Herr zur Lippe). Deposed or abdicated 1749.

Lippe-Detmold
Simon August of Lippe-Detmold, Count and Noble Lord (Graf und Edler Herr zur Lippe) of Lippe-Detmold 1734-1749, deposed or abdicated 1749. Died 1782.

Lorraine
Francis Stephen, Duke of Lorraine, abdicated 1737

Mecca
Sharif Sa'ad Pasha, Grand Sharif of Mecca. Deposed 1672, restored 1693, redeposed 1694, restored 1694, redeposed 1702.
Sharif 'Abdu'l-Muhsin bin Ahmad, Grand Sharif of Mecca, deposed 1704.

Modena
Ercole III d'Este, Duke of Modena, deposed 1796

Naples
Philip IV, King of Naples (and Spain), lost control of Naples 1707, abandoned claims 1713
Charles VI, King of Naples (and Holy Roman Emperor), ceded control 1735
Charles VII, King of Naples, abdicated 1759
Ferdinand IV, King of Naples, deposed 1799, restored later that year, deposed again 1806, restored 1815

Parma
Charles I, Duke of Parma, abdicated 1735
Maria Theresa, Duchess of Parma, abdicated 1748

Persia
Husayn, Shah of Persia, deposed 1722
Ashraf Hotaki, Shah of Persia, deposed 1729
Abbas III, Shah of Persia, deposed 1736
Adil Shah, Shah of Persia, deposed 1748
Suleiman II, Shah of Persia, deposed 1750
Shahrokh Shah, Shah of Persia, deposed 1749, nominally restored 1750, deposed again 1796

Poland
Augustus II, King of Poland, deposed 1704, abdicated 1706, restored 1709
Stanislaus I, deposed 1709, restored 1733 and again deposed later that year
Stanislaus II Augustus Poniatowski, King of Poland, deposed 1795

Russia
Ivan VI, Emperor of Russia, deposed 1741
Peter III, Emperor of Russia, deposed 1762

Sardinia
Charles VI, Holy Roman Emperor, King of Sardinia, exchanged for Sicily 1720
Victor Amadeus II, King of Sardinia, abdicated 1730

Sicily
Victor Amadeus II, King of Sicily, exchanged for Sardinia 1720
Charles V, King of Sicily, abdicated 1759

Spain
"Charles III," Austrian claimant to the Spanish throne, abandoned his claims 1714
Philip V, King of Spain, abdicated 1724, reinstated later that year

Sweden
Ulrika Eleonora, Queen of Sweden, abdicated 1720

Tallo
Karaeng Sapanang Tu-Timoka, Sultan of Tallo, deposed 1761.

Tulsipur
 Raja Nawal Singh Chauhan lost Tulsipar to Gorkhali King Prithvi Narayan, 1763.

Tuscany
Peter Leopold, Grand Duke of Tuscany, abdicated 1790

Vava'u
Vuna of Konokupolu and Vava'u, 5th Tu'i Kanokupolu, deposed 1700.
Takitakimalohi, 3rd Vuna and Tu'i Vava'u, deposed 1799.

See also
List of monarchs who abdicated
List of monarchs who lost their thrones in the 19th century
List of monarchs who lost their thrones in the 17th century
List of monarchs who lost their thrones in the 16th century
List of monarchs who lost their thrones in the 15th century
List of monarchs who lost their thrones in the 14th century
List of monarchs who lost their thrones in the 13th century
List of monarchs who lost their thrones before the 13th century

18
 
Lists of 18th-century people